California is the most populated U.S. state, with an estimated population of 39.2 million as of January 1, 2022. It has people from a wide variety of ethnic, racial, national, and religious backgrounds.

Population

California is the most populated sub-national entity in North America.  If it were an independent country, California would rank 34th in population in the world. It has a larger population than either Canada or Australia.  Its population is one third larger than that of the next most populous state, Texas. California surpassed New York to become the most populous state in 1962. California's population growth has slowed dramatically in the 21st century. In 2010, the state's five most populous counties were Los Angeles County, San Diego County, Orange County, Riverside County, and San Bernardino County, with Riverside County having the largest percentage increase in population. The largest metro areas in California, as of 2010, are Los Angeles, San Francisco-Oakland-San Jose, San Diego, Riverside-San Bernardino, and Sacramento. From 2006 until 2016, the state lost a net population of about 1 million people from emigration to other states, yet the population of the state continued to grow due to immigration from overseas and more births than deaths.

As of 2006, California had an estimated population of 37,172,015, more than 12 percent of the U.S. population.  This includes a natural increase since the last census of 1,557,112 people (i.e., 2,781,539 births minus 1,224,427 deaths) and an increase due to net migration of 751,419 people. Immigration resulted in a net increase of 1,415,879 people, and migration from within the U.S. resulted in a net decrease of 564,100 people.  California is the 13th fastest-growing state. As of 2023 the total fertility rate was 1.52 which is on par with Canada.

No single ethnic group forms a majority of California's population, making the state a minority-majority state. Hispanics (of any race) are the largest single ethnic group in the state. Spanish is the state's second most widely spoken language. Areas with especially large Spanish speaking populations include the Los Angeles metropolitan area, the California-Mexico border counties of San Diego and Imperial, and the San Joaquin Valley. Nearly 43% of Californian residents speak a language other than English at home, a proportion far higher than any other state.

In 2011, there were an estimated 2.6 million undocumented immigrants residing in California. California is home to almost 25% of the country's undocumented population, making up 6% of California's residents overall. Two-thirds of California's undocumented population have lived in the state for more than 10 years.

About 52% of California's public school students in the 2011–12 school year identified themselves as Hispanic or Latino and 26% as non-Hispanic Caucasian. The following ethnic groups made up the rest of the statewide public school student body: Asians (11%), African Americans (7%), Native Americans (0.7%), and Pacific Islanders (0.6%). Students of mixed race made up about 2% of the public schools. Hispanics have made up the majority of the state's public schools since 2010. Los Angeles Unified School District, the largest school district in California and second largest in the nation, is 73% Hispanic, 10% African American, 9% non-Hispanic Caucasian, 6% Asian, 0.5% Native American, and 0.4% Pacific Islander.

Net domestic migration

Racial/Ethnic makeup

According to the 2020 U.S. census, California's population was 34.7% Non-Hispanic White, 5.7% African American, 1.5% Native American, 16.1% Asian, 0.4% Pacific Islander, 13% Two or more races, and 39.4% Hispanic or Latino of any race.  Hispanics are the largest racial/ethnic group in California. Non-Hispanic whites have decreased from about 76.3 - 78% of the state's population in 1970 to 36.6% in 2018. While the population of minorities accounts for 100.7 million of 300 million U.S. residents, 20% of the national total live in California (2008).

According to 2018 U.S. Census Bureau estimates, California's population was 59.5% White (36.6% Non-Hispanic White), 14.7% Asian, 13.8% Some Other Race, 5.8% Black or African American, 0.8% Native American and Alaskan Native, 0.4% Pacific Islander, and 5.1% from two or more races.  with others identifying as Some Other Race (34.4%), Multiracial (5.1%), Black (0.7%), American Indian and Alaskan Native (1.1%), Asian (0.5%), and Hawaiian and Pacific Islander (0.1%). By ethnicity, 39.3% of the total population is Hispanic-Latino (of any race) and 60.7% is Non-Hispanic (of any race).

California has the highest number, and second highest percentage, of Asian Americans by state. Only Hawaii has a higher Asian American percentage than California. While New Mexico and Texas have higher percentages of Hispanics, California has the highest total number of Hispanics of any U.S. state. Hispanics are the largest single ethnic group in the state.

The largest named ancestries in California are Mexican (25%), German (9%), Irish (7.7%), English (7.4%), and Italian(5.8%); there are 65 other ethnicities with sizable populations in California including Arabs, Albanians, Australians, Brazilians, Canadians, Haitians, Iranians/Persians, and Somalis as examples. Both Los Angeles and San Francisco have large numbers of residents with English, French, Italian, Iranian/Persian, German, Russian, and Scandinavian ancestry.

California has the largest population of white Americans in the U.S., totaling 21,453,934 residents as of the 2010 census. The state has the fifth largest population of African Americans in the U.S., an estimated 2,299,072 residents. California's Asian population is estimated at 4.9 million, approximately one-third of the nation's estimated 15 million Asian Americans. California's Native American population of 285,512 is the third-largest of any state, behind Arizona and Oklahoma. 

Since the 2000 U.S. census, California has been known as the second state in U.S. history (after Hawaii since its statehood in 1959) to have a non-white majority when excluding Hispanic whites, and since 2014, the first state to have a Latino plurality surpass other racial/ethnic groups. The media discussed the possibility of Latinos becoming a majority in the 21st century, for the first time since statehood (1850) when massive immigration of Anglo-Americans during the California Gold Rush of 1848-1849 reduced Spanish speakers to 20% of the population.

White Americans

European Americans

California has the largest population of European Americans of any state.  For example, in 2000, California had more Bulgarian Americans, Romanian Americans, and Hungarian Americans than any other U.S. state. Los Angeles and San Francisco have large Russian American and Ukrainian American populations; and a long history of German, Irish, Italian, English, and Polish communities established by immigrants in the late 19th century. There are also many English Americans, Irish Americans, and French Americans whose ancestors were the original 49ers, also known as the California Gold Rush immigrants.

California has over one million residents each with Spanish or Portuguese ancestry, with communities along coastal parts of the state such as San Diego, Long Beach, Camarillo, Santa Clara Valley (including Cupertino, Gilroy and San Jose), Salinas Valley, Santa Maria Valley, and San Joaquin Valley. A small wave of Danish, Dutch and Swedish immigrants founded towns like Lathrop near Stockton, Artesia near Los Angeles, Kingsburg south of Fresno, Solvang north of Santa Barbara in the late 1800s and the private community of Sveadal located 15 miles south of San Jose and populated entirely by members of the Swedish American Patriotic League. Small colonies of early 19th-century Russian settlement under the Russian American Company are in Fort Ross, Calistoga and the Russian River Valley in Sonoma and Napa counties. California also has the third largest Greek American population in the United States, behind New York and Massachusetts. The Los Angeles Harbor area of San Pedro has a sizeable Croatian American population. Small Amish/Mennonite colonies exist in an area bordered by the towns Oakdale, Riverbank and Ripon near Modesto and in Reedley, Sanger and Orange Cove near Fresno in the San Joaquin Valley; and in the outer Salinas Valley.

The most important Italian community in California is in North Beach District at San Francisco. 60% of Californian Italo-Americans are from northern Italy.
Others numerous groups are from Tuscany and Sicily.
Many Italians also live in San Diego, with Little Italy having San Diego's largest Italian population.

There is also a large Dutch community in California. The Dutch settled in Redlands, Ontario, Ripon and Bellflower.

Hispanic and Latino Americans

Latinos, mainly Mexican Americans, form major portions of the population of Southern California, especially in Los Angeles, as well as the San Joaquin Valley. The city of Los Angeles is often said to be the largest Mexican community in the United States. Census records kept track of the growth since 1850, but Mexicans and Mexican Americans have lived in California since Spanish Colonial times. However, the number and percentage population of Latinos living in California increased rapidly in the late 20th century.

The Imperial Valley on the U.S.-Mexican border is about 70–75% Latino; communities with many Latinos can also be found in Riverside County, especially at its eastern end, and the Coachella Valley. The Central Valley has many Mexican American migrant farm workers. Latinos are the majority in 14 counties: Colusa, Fresno, Glenn, Imperial, Kern, Kings, Madera, Merced, Monterey, Napa, San Benito, Santa Cruz, Tulare, and Yolo counties.

Latinos make up at least 20% of the San Francisco Bay Area. Many live in San Mateo, Redwood City, Alameda, Contra Costa, and Santa Clara counties, as well in San Francisco. The Napa Valley and Salinas Valley have predominantly Latino communities established by migrant farm workers. San Jose is about 30–35 percent Latino, the largest Latino community in northern California, while the Mission District, San Francisco and Lower/West Oakland have barrios established by Mexican and Latin American immigrants. The Mexican American communities of East Los Angeles and Logan Heights, San Diego, as well the San Joaquin Valley are centers of historic Chicano and Latino cultures.

California also has the largest populations of Hispanics/Latinos in the country. Most of the state's Latinos have Mexican ancestry, having the largest Mexican population in the United States, making up about 31 percent of the state population. California has a large and diverse population, having the largest Central American, especially Salvadoran population in the United States. Guatemalan Americans are spread out in Southern California after previously being centered in Los Angeles between 1970 and 2010. California also has many Cuban Americans, Puerto Rican Americans, Honduran Americans, and Nicaraguan Americans, along with people of Chilean, Colombian, Peruvian, and other South American ancestry. Los Angeles has had the United States' largest Central American community, as well as the largest Mexican American community, since the 1910s. In fact, the 1900 census record finds 319 to 619 out of 100,000 residents in the city of Los Angeles were "Spanish" or "Mexican". (see Demographics of Los Angeles). Nearly 31 percent of Los Angeles itself is of Mexican descent, having the largest Mexican population of any city in the United States. 12,392 Belizeans also live in California.

In Mariposa County, there is a very small community of Californios or Spanish American people as they identify themselves, that dates back before the U.S. annexation of California. Hornitos is home to an estimated 1,000 people and many have Spanish heritage. The community's "Spanish" Californio culture is closely linked with Mexico and other Latin American nations.

Middle Eastern Americans

Little Arabia is an ethnic enclave in Orange County, California, the center for Orange County's Arab Americans, who number more than 24,000 (as of 2000).  It is sometimes referred to as "Little Gaza" which was a play on the original designation of this area as the "Garza Island." Little Arabia grew significantly in the 1990s with the arrival of immigrants from the Middle East, and is the home to thousands of Arab Americans predominantly hailing from Egypt, Syria, Palestine, and Yemen.

More than 500,000 Iranian Americans live throughout Southern California, including about 20% of the population of Beverly Hills. Iranian American communities also flourish in the San Fernando Valley, Orange County, San Diego and the San Joaquin Valley. The majority of Iranian Americans immigrated after the Pahlavi dynasty was overthrown in 1979.

California is also home to many Armenian Americans; the highest concentration of Americans of Armenian descent is in the Greater Los Angeles area, where 166,498 people have identified themselves as Armenian to the 2000 Census, comprising over 40% of the 385,488 people who identified Armenian origins in the US at the time. Many of these live in Glendale north of Los Angeles, as well as a large community in Fresno. The size of the Armenian American population is disputed, however. According to a 1988 news article, California had about 500,000 ethnic Armenians with over half of them living in the Greater Los Angeles area.

More than 1,300,000 Jewish Americans live in California, the majority of whom are Ashkenazi Jews. In addition, there are more than 250,000 Israeli Americans live in the Los Angeles area, according to the Israeli American Council. There are also significant Israeli American populations in the Bay Area, San Francisco, and San Jose areas of Northern California. The largest Karaite Jewish population outside of Israel exists in the Bay Area, consisting of several hundreds descendants of refugees from the Egyptian Karaite community, as well as some recent converts. Their community is centered around the only Karaite synagogue outside the Middle East, Congregation B'nai Israel, located in Daly City. The Moroccan Jewish community in California is one of the largest in North America, approximately 10,000 Moroccan Jews reside in the Greater Los Angeles area, mostly in Pico-Robertson, North Hollywood, and Beverly Hills. Many are the descendants of community members who first emigrated to the United States in the aftermath of World War II. Many others came later in the 20th century from Israel, and beginning in the early 21st century from France due to increasing antisemitism there. The community has their own synagogues as well as a community center.

Over 50,000 Afghan Americans are concentrated in the East Bay primarily in Alameda County and its communities of Fremont and Hayward; Afghans also live throughout the state (esp. Orange County and Ventura County).

There is also large population of Assyrian descent living in the Central Valley, with large communities in Modesto, Ceres and Turlock, as well as throughout the Central Coast and the California Desert (i.e. the Coachella and Imperial valleys). San Diego has one of the largest concentrations of Chaldean immigrants in the United States.

About an estimated 3,000 Moroccan Americans are living in Los Angeles, Long Beach, and Santa Ana.

Turkish Americans and Azerbaijani Americans form moderately-sized communities in both Los Angeles and San Francisco. The state also has over 2,000 Circassian Americans with a little community in Anaheim.

African Americans

California has 2.3 million African Americans as of 2010, the largest population of black or African Americans of the western U.S states, and the 5th largest black population in the United States. Cities that have the largest share of African Americans and have historically been black cultural centers include (11 largest in the state): Compton, Inglewood, Long Beach, Los Angeles, Oakland, Richmond, Riverside, Sacramento, San Bernardino, San Diego, and Vallejo.

Most African Americans in California have origins from Southern states like Louisiana, Texas, Arkansas, and Oklahoma.

There are many other cities and towns in the state with sizeable African American populations. These include:

Northern: Berkeley,
Dublin,
East Palo Alto,
Emeryville,
Fairfield,
Hayward,
Marin City,
San Leandro,
and Suisun City.

Central: Bakersfield,
Fresno,
Kings-Tulare counties,
Merced,
Modesto,
and Stockton.

Southern: Adelanto,
Altadena,
Apple Valley,
California City,
Carson,
Corona,
Desert Hot Springs,
Fontana,
Gardena,
Hawthorne,
Lakewood,
Lancaster,
Lynwood,
Moreno Valley,
National City,
Oceanside,
Palmdale,
Palm Springs,
Pasadena,
Perris,
Pomona,
Rialto,
Twentynine Palms,
and Victorville.

African Americans are approximately 7 percent of the state population. The state percentage of African Americans has dropped in the 1990s and 2000s, though the state's overall number of African Americans has increased in that time period. The black population in East and West Oakland and South Central Los Angeles - places where they held the majority for decades - has greatly decreased as the black middle class has relocated to nearby suburbs, including those in the Inland Empire and Antelope Valley in Southern California and the Sacramento metropolitan area in Northern California. Many African Americans have also moved to the South, where their grandparents may have come from in the "Great Migration" of the mid-20th century.

African Americans have made important contributions to the state's hip-hop and R&B music culture. African American musical artists born and/or raised in California include: Snoop Dogg, Dr. Dre, Ice Cube, E-40, Nate Dogg, En Vogue, Tony! Toni! Tone!, Too Short, Eazy-E, N.W.A, Keyshia Cole, Digital Underground, JJ Fad, Barry White, The Pointer Sisters, Saweetie, Tyga, Doja Cat, Blueface, and Kendrick Lamar.

California has a number of West Indian (Afro-Caribbean American) and African immigrants from countries such as Cape Verde, Eritrea, Ethiopia, Ghana, Kenya, Nigeria, Senegal, Somalia, South Africa (including white South Africans), Tanzania, and Yemen across from the Horn of Africa. Immigrants from these countries have established communities in a number of cities in the state, such as Little Ethiopia in West Los Angeles. In addition to the Ethiopian community in Los Angeles, there is a significant Ethiopian population in Oakland/Berkeley. Nuer refugees from South Sudan have migrated to the Sacramento area. There are Cape Verdean communities in Solano County, the Santa Clara Valley, and the San Diego area. As of 2019, there are 13,061 Jamaicans in the state.

There is a Louisiana Creole community in California.

Native Americans

As of 2010, California's Native American population of 362,801 was the most of any state. It also has the most Native American tribes, indigenous to the state or not, but the majority of known Californian Indian tribes became extinct in the late 19th century. The U.S. Census includes Latin American Indian, especially immigrants who belonged to indigenous peoples or who have Amerindian heritage from North and South America.

The Cherokee Nation is the largest tribe in the state with a population of 22,000 in 2020, although the number of Cherokee descendants are at 110,000 in the earlier census taken in 2010 and any persons residing in California of Cherokee descent may surpass 600,000 according to demographers. Their tribal nation is in the northeast part of Oklahoma but they live across the state and neighboring states. They are often descendants of Dust Bowl refugees in the 1930s and 1940s who migrated to the state's farming counties and urban areas for jobs. The largest urban American Indian communities are Los Angeles/Long Beach, San Francisco/Oakland, Sacramento, and San Diego areas.

California also has significant populations of the Apache, Chickasaw, Choctaw, Muscogee, Seminole, Hopi, Zuni, Navajo, Blackfeet, Shoshone, Paiute, Pueblo, Tohono Oʼodham, Cahuilla, Chumash, Karuk, Yurok, and Yokuts tribes. The Cahuilla in the Coachella Valley have profited from real estate land leases, and much of Indio and Palm Springs are tribal-owned lands under legal tribal jurisdiction.

Asian Americans

The state has a long history of established East, South, and Southeast Asian American communities, including Chinese since the 1850s, Japanese since the 1880s, Indians since the 1890s and Filipinos for over a century since 1900. A large wave of Asian immigration since 1965, following the Immigration and Nationality Act of 1965 which ended the ban on Asian immigration, brought in more Chinese along with Koreans and Southeast Asians after the Vietnam war ended in the late 1970s. South Asians are also a fast-growing group.

As of the 2010 Census there were a total of 17,941,286 respondents who claimed to be Asian American and Asian. Out of these respondents in the United States, 30.9% live in California, with 5,556,592 Asian Americans being counted by the 2010 census. This is a 1.5 million growth in population from the 2000 census, making Asian Americans 14.9 percent of the state's population. Out of those almost 5.6 million Asian Americans in California there are 1,474,707 Filipinos, 1,349,111 Chinese, 647,589 Vietnamese, 590,445 Indians, 505,225 Koreans, 428,140 Japanese, 109,928 Taiwanese, 102,317 Cambodians, 91,224 Hmong, 69,303 Laotians, 67,707 Thais, 53,474 Pakistanis, 39,506 Borneans, Sumatrans, and Indonesians, 17,978 Burmese, 11,929 Sri Lankans, 10,494 Bangladeshis, 6,231 Nepalese, 5,595 Malaysians, 4,993 Mongolians, 1,513 Singaporeans, 1,377 Ryukyuans, and 750 Bhutanese.

East Asian Americans

Chinese Americans are numerous in San Francisco, Oakland, the East Bay, South Bay, the Central Coast of California, Sacramento, San Diego, and the San Gabriel Valley region of Los Angeles County. The San Francisco Bay Area has a greater concentration of Cantonese-speaking Chinese than any other region in the United States. The Mexican border community of Calexico, California in addition to Mexicali has large numbers of Chinese Mexican Americans, that is, Mexican Americans of Chinese ancestry. Smaller Chinese communities can also be found in San Jacinto Valley, Lake Elsinore, and Victorville.

Southern California has perhaps the largest Taiwan-born Chinese American community in the U.S., particularly in the San Gabriel Valley (i.e. Walnut and Diamond Bar), Buena Park, Cerritos, West Covina, Irvine, communities in the South Bay, Los Angeles and southern Orange County. Many minority groups from China also live in California, for example, there are Tibetan and Mongolian Americans concentrated in San Francisco, Oakland, San Jose, Orange County, and the Los Angeles/Long Beach area.

Large Korean American communities exist in the Koreatown area of Los Angeles, the eastern San Gabriel Valley, the San Fernando Valley, Cerritos/Long Beach, South Bay, Los Angeles, northern Orange County and San Diego area. There is another large Korean American population in the San Francisco Bay Area, and Koreans are growing in number in the suburban Inland Empire region, in cities such as Chino Hills, Corona, Desert Hot Springs, and Loma Linda south of San Bernardino. Since 1990, the Korean American and African American populations relocated westward and northward in the Los Angeles area.

The South Bay area and Little Tokyo have a large Japanese American community. Japanese Americans, however, are also concentrated in San Francisco and across the Bay Area, San Jose, the Salinas Valley and Santa Cruz County; and smaller communities in the Sacramento, Fresno, Bakersfield, Anaheim, San Diego, San Bernardino, Santa Barbara, and Stockton areas. Despite the presence of Japanese goods stores, media outlets and restaurants in the state, most "Little Tokyos" and "Japantowns" were evacuated during the forced relocation of Japanese Americans during World War II (see Japanese American Internment). As a result, most Japanese Americans in urban areas do not reside in historical Japanese communities.

South Asian Americans

California has the largest Indian American population in the U.S. Many live in the Los Angeles Metropolitan Area, San Diego, and the San Francisco Bay Area. The Los Angeles suburbs of Artesia and Cerritos have large Indian American communities. San Jose, Fremont, and other Silicon Valley cities have many Indian Americans who are employed in the high-tech industry. Many Indian Americans are in Central Valley cities such as Stockton, Bakersfield, Fresno, Yuba City, and the Imperial Valley. Most South Asians in California are Indian American, but there are also Pakistani Americans, Bangladeshi Americans, and Sri Lankan Americans (see Sinhalese and Tamils) esp. concentrated in the San Gabriel Valley (Covina Valley) of the Los Angeles area. California is home to the unique Punjabi Mexican American community, mostly centered around Yuba City.

California is home to 200,000 Roma of the estimated one million in America. Romani Americans, also known pejoratively as American Gypsies, originated in India and came to the United States via Europe. There is a Romani community in Los Angeles and San Francisco.

Southeast Asian Americans

California has the largest American population of Southeast Asians, concentrated in the Los Angeles-Long Beach, Sacramento, and Fresno areas. This includes the Hmong and Vietnamese, including Chinese Vietnamese. Long Beach has one of the largest Cambodian American communities in the United States. The neighboring cities of Westminster and Garden Grove have the largest Vietnamese American community outside of Vietnam and are often dubbed "Little Saigon". Vietnamese and Cambodian immigrants also settled in the San Francisco Bay Area, especially San Jose, Santa Clara and Sunnyvale, as well across the San Joaquin Valley and in San Diego.

Filipino Americans are particularly numerous in Los Angeles, Sacramento, San Francisco, San Diego, San Mateo, and Solano counties, and in southern California communities such as Artesia, Baldwin Park, Carson, Cerritos, Covina, West Covina, and the Eagle Rock district of Los Angeles. Around San Diego, many Filipinos live in the communities of Mira Mesa, National City, and Chula Vista. Delano near Bakersfield, other towns in the San Joaquin Valley, the Inland Empire of Riverside-San Bernardino, Coachella Valley-Imperial Valley region, Salinas, Stockton and Lathrop, and the Santa Maria/San Luis Obispo area also have large Filipino American populations. Daly City south of San Francisco has a large Filipino population and is the largest percentage wise in the United States. As of the 1980s, Filipinos have been the largest population of Asians in California. Twenty percent of registered nurses, in 2013, in California are Filipino.

Over 6,000 Laotian Americans live in the Fresno area, including an even larger Hmong American community, the second-largest of its kind. Other Hmong colonies in the Central Valley of California and Northern California developed since the end of the Vietnam war (1975–79).

California also has a Thai American community of over 250,000, concentrated in Southern California, with small Thai and Southeast Asian communities in Perris and Banning in the Inland Empire region. Los Angeles has the largest Thai population outside of Thailand and is also home to the world's first Thai Town. About 150,000 Indonesians live in Southern California, primarily the Los Angeles and San Diego areas.

Pacific Islander Americans

The state has 150,000 residents with Pacific Islander ancestry. Most, 80,000, are Native Hawaiians of measurable Polynesian ancestry; many also have Asian, European, or other ancestries. There are also 25,000 Samoan Americans originally from American Samoa or Western Samoa.  Most live in Long Beach and the Los Angeles suburbs of Carson, Artesia, Cerritos, and Redondo Beach, Oceanside, and Upland. About 10,000 Chamorros from Guam and Northern Mariana Islands live in northern California, the largest Micronesian community in the mainland United States. An estimated 10,000 Tahitians from French Polynesia live in southern California.

There are also many Palauan Americans in southern California, specifically in the San Diego area. This includes Vista which has a population of 677 Palauan Americans according to the 2010 US Census. Members of the Palauan community often also have Malay, Indonesian, Micronesian, Melanesian, Japanese, and other East Asian ancestries. Many Chuukese or Trukese live in San Diego.

Ancestries of Californians

Country of birth

Birth data

Note: Births in table do not add up, because Hispanics are counted both by their ethnicity and by their race, giving a higher overall number.

Persons of Hispanic origin may be of any race.

Languages

As of 2010, 20,379,282 of California residents age 5 and older spoke English at home as a primary language, while 10,672,610 spoke Spanish, 1,231,425 Chinese (which includes Cantonese and Mandarin), 796,451 Tagalog, 559,932 Vietnamese, 367,523 Korean, 192,980 Armenian, and Persian was spoken as a main language by 203,770 of the population over the age of five. In total, 14,644,136 of California's population age 5 and older spoke a mother language other than English.

Comparatively, according to the 2007 American Community Survey, 42.6 percent of California's population older than five spoke a language other than English at home, with 73 percent of those also speaking English well or very well, while 9.8 did not speak English at all.

California had the highest concentration of Vietnamese or Chinese speakers in the United States, second highest concentration of Korean or Spanish speakers in the United States, and third highest concentration of Tagalog speakers in the United States. California was historically one of the most linguistically diverse areas in the world, and is home to more than 70 indigenous languages derived from 64 root languages in 6 language families. A survey conducted between 2007 and 2009 identified 23 different indigenous languages of Mexico that are spoken among California farmworkers.

Over 200 languages are known to be spoken and read in California, with Spanish used as the state's "alternative" language. California has more than 100 indigenous languages, making California one of the most linguistically diverse areas in the world. All of California's indigenous languages are endangered, although there are now efforts toward language revitalization.

The official language of California has been English since the passage of Proposition 63 in 1986. However, many state, city, and local government agencies still continue to print official public documents in numerous languages. For example, the California Department of Motor Vehicles offers the written exam for the standard C Class driver's license in 31 languages along with English, and the audio exam in 11 languages. The politics of language is a major political issue in the state, especially in regard to language policy controlling the teaching and official use of immigrant languages.

As a result of the state's increasing diversity and migration from other areas across the country and around the globe, linguists began noticing a noteworthy set of emerging characteristics of spoken English in California since the late 20th century. This dialect, known as California English, has a vowel shift and several other phonological processes that are different from the dialects used in other regions of the country.

Religion

California has the most Catholics in the United States, ahead of New York State, as well as large Protestant, non-religious, Jewish, and Muslim populations. It also has the largest Latter-day Saint population outside of Utah. The state also has a large American Jewish community, the second-largest in the nation, as well as largest in the western U.S., and third-largest in the world, mainly concentrated in Los Angeles, Beverly Hills, San Francisco, Oakland, Sacramento, and Palm Springs.

California also has large Muslim communities in west Los Angeles, San Diego, Beverly Hills, Orange County, Santa Clara County, and the Modesto area.

Most Catholics in California are of Mexican, Central American, Irish, German, Italian, Vietnamese, Filipino, and Korean ancestry. The population of Catholic Californians is rapidly growing due to the influx of Latin American, Asian, African, and Middle Eastern Christian immigrants. In the Archdiocese of Los Angeles, Sunday Mass is celebrated in 42 different languages representing more than 30 ethnic groups from around the world. The Catholic dioceses of Orange, Los Angeles and San Jose have the largest Catholic diaspora of Vietnamese Catholics in world outside of Vietnam, estimated to be about 250,000-300,000 Catholics out of a total Vietnamese California population of 1.3 Million.

The largest Christian denominations in California in 2000 were the Catholic Church with 10,079,310; the Church of Jesus Christ of Latter-day Saints with 529,575; and the Southern Baptist Convention with 471,119. Jewish congregations had 994,000 adherents, or 3% of the Californian population.

Hinduism, Buddhism, Shintō, Sikhism, and Taoism were introduced in part by Asian immigrants. As the 20th century came to a close, forty percent of all Buddhists in America resided in Southern California. The Los Angeles metropolitan area has become unique in the Buddhist world as the only place where representative organizations of every major school of Buddhism can be found in a single urban center. The City of Ten Thousand Buddhas in Northern California and Hsi Lai Temple in Southern California are two of the largest Buddhist temples in the Western Hemisphere.

California has the highest Hindu population in the United States, most of them Indian Americans. Many of the prominent Hindu temples including the Malibu Hindu Temple are located in California.

With more than 1,232,000 Jews as of 2015, California has the highest number of Jews of any state except New York. Many Jews live in the West Los Angeles and (esp. west) San Fernando Valley regions of Los Angeles. At the present time, one of California's senators, Dianne Feinstein, is Jewish.  Historic synagogues include Beth Jacob Congregation (Beverly Hills, California), Congregation B'nai Israel (Sacramento, California), and Temple Israel (Stockton, California). Chabad, The Rohr Jewish Learning Institute, and Aish HaTorah are active in California.

California also has the largest Muslim community in the United States, an estimated one percent of the population, mostly residing in Southern California. Approximately 100,000 Muslims reside in San Diego.

California has more members of The Church of Jesus Christ of Latter-day Saints and Temples than any state except Utah. Latter-day Saints (Mormons) have played important roles in the settlement of California throughout the state's history. For example, a group of a few hundred Latter-day Saint converts from the Northeastern United States and Europe arrived at what would become San Francisco in the 1840s aboard the ship Brooklyn, more than doubling the population of the small town. A group of Latter-day Saints also established the city of San Bernardino in Southern California in 1851. According to the LDS Church 2014 statistics, 780,200 Latter-day Saints reside in the state of California, attending almost 1400 congregations statewide.

The Seventh-day Adventist Church is headquartered in Loma Linda in San Bernardino county 60 miles east of Los Angeles, where the church members form the majority of the town's population. The SDA church there has a university, a free hospital and a TV station (3ABN or the 3 Angels Broadcasting Network). The town is known for a large number of centenarians.

A Pew Research Center survey revealed, however, that California is less religious than the rest of the United States: 62% of Californians say they are "absolutely certain" of the belief "in God or a universal spirit", while in the nation 71% say so. The survey also revealed that 48% of Californians say religion is "very important", while the figure for the U.S. in general is 56%.

According to Pew Forum there are less than 1% Wiccans and other pagans in state with Central Valley Wicca and Reclaiming Wicca as key.

Income and socioeconomic factors 
California's income distribution is quite broad compared to the country's as a whole; its proportions of residents with no income and of residents with income over $100,000 are both higher than the national average. This broad distribution combined with high housing and living costs give California an abnormally high poverty rate. The Census Bureau's Supplemental Poverty Measure, calculated by comparing household income to a locally-adjusted poverty threshold, reports that 20.7% of California's population has income insufficient for their basic needs, as compared to 12.9% for the U.S. as a whole. This calculation of income includes the benefits of California welfare programs such as food stamps and earned income tax credits — without these, the state's poverty rate would be 28%.

The trends of low income in California are complex; from 1975 to 2014, real (inflation-adjusted) incomes have alternated between rises and sharp declines. These incomes have decreased overall for those outside the top 20th percentile, with the bottom 20th percentile seeing an average decline of 1% per year during that period. Correspondingly, the percent of Californians with income below their poverty threshold has risen and fallen, but has on average increased by a tenth of a percentage point per year.

Increasing income inequality has had many effects on Californians' lives, including on life expectancy, which can be taken as a proxy for health or even general welfare. A study conducted by Clarke et al. related life expectancy to socioeconomic status (SES, an index including income and other related factors), finding that Californians in the top 20% by SES live on average six years longer than those in the bottom 20% (81 years, compared to 75). This disparity becomes even more pronounced when intersected with race: White males in the top 20% live 14 years longer than African American males in the bottom 20% (for females, the difference is 10 years).

The complexity of the state's low-income trends were visible when, in response to growing Chinese and Spanish-speaking populations, the city of Oakland implemented the nation's first policy of recruiting bilingual applicants for public-facing city jobs in 2001. This increased the employment of Hispanic and Chinese bilinguals throughout the public workforce, but also lowered (monolingual) Black employment.

See also
California locations by race
California statistical areas
California exodus
Demographics of the United States

Notes

References

External links

 
California